Jože Babič (13 February 1917 – 10 May 1996) was a Slovenian film, theatre and television director.

His two most notable feature films were Three Quarters of a Sun (Tri četrtine sonca, 1959), for which we won the Golden Arena for Best Director at the 1959 Pula Film Festival, and The Party (Veselica, 1960).

Television
''Ščuke pa ni, ščuke pa ne (1980), Slovenian television comedy series, director

References

External links

Jože Babič at the Slovenian Film Fund website 

Slovenian film directors
1917 births
1996 deaths
Prešeren Award laureates
Golden Arena for Best Director winners
Yugoslav film directors
People from the Municipality of Hrpelje-Kozina